Gerda Pamler (born 1958) is a German former Paralympic alpine skier and artist. She competed at the 1992, 1994 and 1998 Winter Paralympics. She won six medals, two gold, three silver and one bronze.

In 1986, she was injured in a skiing accident. She publishes her handbike tours on alpenvereinaktiv.

Career 
She was selected in the German national Paralympic ski team to participate in three Paralympic Winter Games, in 1992, 1994 and 1998. 

At the 1992 Winter Paralympics in Albertville, Pamler won gold in the slalom  LW 10/11 race (in a time of 2:03.83). She won two silver medals: in the super-G (in 1: 34.48, behind Sarah Will in 1:27.66, ahead of third Toshiko Gouno in 1:48.89 ); and downhill (with a time of 1:31.09 ), behind Sarah Will in 1:24.08, and ahead of Candace Cable in 1:37.02. 

At the 1994 Winter Paralympic Games,she won three medals: gold in 3:12.39 in the giant slalom LWX-XII, silver in the super G LWX-XII (time 1: 28.24), and bronze in the downhill LWX-XII (in a time of 1:36.23, behind Sarah Will 1: 30.46 and Kelley Fox 1:34.55).

Pamler competed at the 1998 Paralympic Winter Games in Nagano , but was disqualified.

References

External links 

 Official website
 Die Pamler Gerda über das Kaunertaler Getscherskigebiet 2015

1958 births
Living people
Skiers from Munich
Paralympic alpine skiers of Germany
German female alpine skiers
Alpine skiers at the 1992 Winter Paralympics
Alpine skiers at the 1994 Winter Paralympics
Alpine skiers at the 1998 Winter Paralympics
Medalists at the 1992 Winter Paralympics
Medalists at the 1994 Winter Paralympics
Paralympic gold medalists for Germany
Paralympic silver medalists for Germany
Paralympic bronze medalists for Germany